Trypucie  is a village of 300 people in the administrative district of Gmina Turośń Kościelna, within Białystok County, Podlaskie Voivodeship, in northeastern Poland, approximately  north of Turośń Kościelna and  southwest of the regional capital, Białystok.

References

Trypucie